Dnyanganga is a minor river in Buldhana district of Maharashtra, India. It is a tributary of the Purna River, which itself is a tributary of the Tapti River.

See also

List of rivers of India
Rivers of India

External links

References

Tributaries of Purna river
Rivers of Maharashtra
Rivers of India